Yağca can refer to:

 Yağca, Döşemealtı
 Yağca, Kemah